Copper(I) fluoride or cuprous fluoride is an inorganic compound with the chemical formula CuF. Its existence is uncertain. It was reported in 1933 to have a sphalerite-type crystal structure. Modern textbooks state that CuF is not known, since fluorine is so electronegative that it will always oxidise copper to its +2 oxidation state. Complexes of CuF such as [(Ph3P)3CuF] are, however, known and well characterised.

Synthesis and reactivity
Unlike other copper(I) halides like copper(I) chloride, copper(I) fluoride tends to disproportionate into copper(II) fluoride and copper in a one-to-one ratio at ambient conditions, unless it is stabilised through complexation as in the example of [Cu(N2)F].

2CuF → Cu + CuF2

See also 
 Copper(II) fluoride, the other simple fluoride of copper

References 

Fluorides
Metal halides
Copper(I) compounds
Zincblende crystal structure
Hypothetical_chemical_compounds